= Harpalitae =

Former supertribe of ground beetles

Harpalitae has been considered a supertribe of ground beetles in the family Carabidae in the past. With the reorganization of the family Carabidae and subfamily Harpalinae, only four tribes were left in Harpalinae. The supertribe Harpalitae is no longer in common use, with the four tribes classified directly under the subfamily Harpalinae.
